Jersey Gods is a comic book published by Image Comics. It was written by Glen Brunswick, pencilled and inked by Dan McDaid, with colors by Rachelle Rosenberg. The covers were drawn by Mike Allred and coloured by Laura Allred. Alternative covers were also provided by Dan McDaid, Darwyn Cooke, Paul Pope and Whilce Porticio.
A back-up strip, Tales from the Great War, was written by Mark Waid and drawn by Joe Infurnari.
Prior to publication, teaser strips appeared in Popgun volume 2 and Invincible #55.

Plot
The central story concerns the romantic relationship between Zoe, an ordinary resident of New Jersey, and Barock, a God from the fictional world of Neboron.

Collected editions
 Volume 1: I'd Live and I'd Die for You 
 Volume 2: And This is Home 
 Volume 3: Thunder Road

Notes

External links
 Jersey Gods official website
 Read issue #1 here
 Read issue #10 at Newsarama
 Image Comics' Jersey Gods page
 Comic Book Resources review
 Review of part 3
 Mark Waid and Joe Infurnari interview about Tales from the Great War
 Interview with Brunswick and McDaid at CBR
 Newsarama video interview with the creators

Image Comics titles